Randy Parsons: American Luthier is a 2011 documentary short film about Randy Parsons, an American luthier whose client list includes Jack White, Jimmy Page, Sammy Hagar, Death Cab for Cutie, Peter Frampton, Joe Perry, and Modest Mouse.

Synopsis
American Luthier focuses on Randy Parsons’ transformation from aspiring musician to guitar-maker. The guitar had been Parsons’ identity since he was a child, but after studying classical and jazz guitar in college, he realized that he would never make a living as a musician.  So he gave it up — he didn’t even own a guitar in his mid-twenties — and then one day he had a vision of how the guitar would come back into his life. Now Parsons is creating instruments that are highly sought after works of art for clients like Jack White, Jimmy Page and Joe Perry. This is a film is about someone who gave up their passion for playing guitars and discovered that they had a passion for making guitars. Parsons’ success is a testament to doing what we love in life and work, even if it requires taking a second look at your dreams, and finding a different way to be a rockstar.

Production
Randy Parsons: American Luthier was produced, directed, filmed and edited by  David Aldrich. Timothy Batzel is also credited with cinematography. The music in scene four is  Michael Chorney's "Shabaz", found on his album Oom Pah Of The Ghost Parade. The film's original score is by David Aldrich, and Randy Parsons.

Awards
The film won Best Documentary Film at the 2011 ITSA Film Festival, Best Cinematography and an Award of Excellence at the 2012 LA Movie Awards, and has been an official selection for more than thirty-five film festivals. The film made its broadcast debut on Public Television as part of Reel NW | Season Four. It was nominated for a 2014 Emmy Award.

References

External links
 
 

2011 films
2011 documentary films
American independent films
2010s English-language films
2010s American films